Boronia revoluta, commonly known as Ironcap boronia, is a plant in the citrus family, Rutaceae and is endemic to the south-west of Western Australia. It is an erect shrub with three-part leaves and pink or white, four-petalled flowers.

Description
The edges of the leaflets are rolled under and the end leaflet longer than those on the side. Flowering occurs from July to October.

Taxonomy and naming
The specific epithet (revoluta) is a Latin word meaning "turned over" or "rolled back".

Distribution and habitat
Ironcap boronia grows in low eucalypt woodland on ridge tops and small hills in the Ironcap and Hatter Hill areas north-east of Lake King in the Mallee biogeographic region.

Conservation
Boronia revoluta is classified as "endangered" under the Australian Government Environment Protection and Biodiversity Conservation Act 1999 and as "Threatened Flora (Declared Rare Flora — Extant)" by the Department of Environment and Conservation (Western Australia). The main threats to the species are mineral exploration and mining.

References

revoluta
Flora of Western Australia
Plants described in 1971
Taxa named by Paul G. Wilson